The Great Country Songbook Volume 2 is a studio album by Australian country music singers Adam Harvey and Beccy Cole, released on 28 April 2017. The album debuted at number 6 on the ARIA Charts, becoming Cole's highest charting album of her career.

The original album, The Great Country Songbook, was released by Harvey and Troy Cassar-Daley. It peaked at number 2 on the ARIA Albums Chart and was certified platinum.

Track listing
 "If I Were a Carpenter" – 2:51
 "Anyone Who Isn't Me Tonight" – 2:17
 "My Elusive Dreams" – 3:33
 "Two Story House" – 2:40
 "You're the Reason Our Kids Are Ugly" – 2:42
 "Don't Fall in Love with a Dreamer" – 3:41
 "Jackson" – 3:01
 "If I Needed You" – 3:35
 "Louisiana Woman, Mississippi Man" – 2:16
 "Just Someone I Used to Know" – 2:27
 "Golden Ring" – 2:58
 "Storms Never Last" – 3:53
 "Islands in the Stream" – 4:07
 "We've Got Tonight" – 3:41
 "It Ain't Me Babe" – 3:03
 "Yesterday's Wine"  (with Troy Cassar-Daley)  – 3:16
 "Country Heroes"  (with Troy Cassar-Daley)  – 3:13

Charts

Weekly charts

Year-end charts

Release history

References

2017 albums
Adam Harvey albums
Beccy Cole albums
Covers albums
Collaborative albums
Sony Music Australia albums